Andriki Kolonia (trans. Ανδρική Κολόνια; Male Cologne) is the second studio album by Greek singer Elli Kokkinou.

It was released on 4 July 2000 by Sony Music Greece and sold 20,000 units in Greece, a breath before the gold status. The album contains twelve, included Kokkinou's hits: "Andriki Kolonia" and "Na Ta Mas Pali", which gained airplay in clubs and radio stations in Greece. The music was composed by Konstantinos Pantzis, with lyrics by Natalia Germanou, Evi Droutsa and Niki Spiropoulou. It was produced by Giannis Doulamis.

Track listing

Singles and music videos 
The following singles were officially released to radio stations.

 "Pao Pao" (I'm Going)
 "Andriki Kolonia" (Male Colonge)
 "Na Ta Mas Pali" (Here We Go Again)
 "Kai Mou Leei" (And He Tells Me)
 "Gia Mia Fora" (For One Time)

Credits and personnel

Personnel 
Giorgos Avlonitis: säzi

Giannis Bithikotsis: baglama, bouzouki, tzoura

Akis Diximos: second vocal

Antonis Gounaris: guitars, outi

Anna Ioannidou: backing vocals

Katerina Kiriakou: backing vocals

Giorgos Kostoglou: bass

Andreas Mouzakis: drums

Konstantinos Pantzis: backing vocals || keyboards, orchestration, programming

Stavros Pazarentsis: clarinet, kaval

Giorgos Roilos: percussion

Production 
Aris Binis (Sofita studio): sound engineer

Vasilis Bouloubasis: hair styling

Doukas Chatzidoukas: styling

Thodoris Chrisanthopoulos (Fabelsound): mastering

Giannis Doulamis: executive producer

Iakovos Kalaitzakis: make up

Vaggelis Kiris: photographer

Lefteris Neromiliotis (Sofita studio): mix engineer

Dimitris Rekouniotis: art direction

Katerina Sideridou: photo processing

References

2000 albums
Elli Kokkinou albums
Greek-language albums
Sony Music Greece albums